
Inowrocław County is a unit of territorial administration and local government (powiat) in Kuyavian-Pomeranian Voivodeship, north-central Poland. It came into being on January 1, 1999, as a result of the Polish local government reforms passed in 1998.

As of 2019 its total population is 165,237, out of which the population of Inowrocław is 72,786, that of Kruszwica is 8,809, that of Janikowo is 8,745, that of Gniewkowo is 7,110, that of Pakość is 5,706, and the rural population is 57,060.

Neighbouring counties
Inowrocław County is bordered by Bydgoszcz County to the north, Toruń County to the north-east, Aleksandrów County to the east, Radziejów County to the south-east, Konin County to the south, Mogilno County to the south-west and Żnin County to the west.

Administrative division
The county is subdivided into nine gminas (one urban, four urban-rural and four rural). These are listed in the following table, in descending order of population.

References
   Polish official population figures 2019 

 
Land counties of Kuyavian-Pomeranian Voivodeship